The Little Rock to Cantonment Gibson Rd-Fourth Street Segment is a history stretch of 19th-century roadbed in rural Pope County, Arkansas. It consists of about one mile of gravel roadway, now designated Fourth Street, east of Atkins, extending from Union Grove Loop in the west to Oakland Drive in the east. Completed by early 1828 as a military road connecting Little Rock to what is now Fort Gibson in Oklahoma, the road is historically significant for its use as part of the Trail of Tears removal of eastern Native Americans to the Indian Territory that is now Oklahoma.

The road section was listed on the National Register of Historic Places in 2009.

See also
National Register of Historic Places listings in Pope County, Arkansas

References

National Register of Historic Places in Pope County, Arkansas
Transport infrastructure completed in 1828
Transportation in Pope County, Arkansas
1828 establishments in Arkansas Territory
Trail of Tears
Native American history of Arkansas
Roads on the National Register of Historic Places in Arkansas